Arthur Dietzsch (* October 2, 1901 in Pausa; † August 26, 1974 in Burgdorf (Hannover region), Germany) was a German KZ trustee (Funktionshäftling) and Kapo as well as an inmate nurse (KZ-Häftlingspfleger) in Block 46 of KZ Buchenwald.

Early life 
Dietzsch attended secondary school (Realgymnasium) in Plauen and volunteered for war service at the very end of the Great War. After the armistice at the end of First World War, he joined the veterans' organisation Der Stahlhelm and joined the very reduced post Versailles German Army i.e. Reichswehr on a 12-year contract. As a rifleman he took part in streetfights against communist rebels. Diligent and reliable, he was selected for Officer's Training in 1920. As an Officer cadet, shortly before his promotion to Lieutenant, he warned the father of his girlfriend about being on a wanted list for the latter's membership in the Communist Party, thus helping him to flee. Dietzsch' action was betrayed, he was court-martialed and sentenced to 14 years in prison for treason.

Inmate in concentration camps 
After Hitler came to power, Dietzsch, still serving his 14 year sentence, was labelled a communist and transferred to KZ Sonnenburg in March 1933, from there to KZ Esterwegen in 1934 and later to KZ Lichtenburg. From February 1938 on, he was an inmate in KZ Buchenwald.
In January 1942, after almost 20 years as a prisoner, he was made a trustee and inmate nurse in the newly founded "KZ Buchenwald Experimentierstation", a quarantine station in Block 46 for medical experiments with the highly infective epidemic typhus better known as spotted fever. There, he worked as a clerk and received on the job nurse training under SS doctors (KZ Lagerärzte) Erwin Ding-Schuler and the latters temporary deputy  Waldemar Hoven. Dietzsch was responsible for the care for spotted fever patients, experimentally infected as well as natural causes. Besides working for his SS masters, he worked closely with the inmates' underground board, the illegal Lagerleitung, better known as Buchenwald Resistance constantly risking his life by hiding prisoners sentenced to death by the SS in his quarantine station.

He worked as head inmate nurse and trustee in Block 46 until the beginning of April 1945. When his SS superior, Erwin Ding-Schuler, with whom Dietzsch had built more than a working relationship, tipped him off about being on a list of 46 inmates to be executed before the SS left the camp, he went into hiding, first in the foundation of a building, later by having himself dug into the ground and covered with loose dirt and leaves by two inmate friends. Dietzsch was liberated with the rest of KZ Buchenwald on April 11, 1945.

After the War 

A free man for the first time in 22 years, Dietzsch was arrested by the German authorities in December 1946 and had to serve as a witness for the defense in the Doctors' Trial (Nürnberger Ärzteprozess), the trials against SS doctors, among others KZ Buchenwald's Gerhard Rose and Waldemar Hoven.
Arrested again by the US Military, he, together with 30 others found himself defendant in the Buchenwald Trial (Buchenwald-Hauptprozess) as an accessory to infecting Allied Prisoners of War with typhoid fever and spotted fever. Several witnesses gave statements for his defense, among them two British Officers and the future diplomat and philosopher Stéphane Hessel, all three of whom had been on death row under the Nazis; Dietzsch had saved their lives by giving them identities of dead prisoners and hiding them in the quarantine station. Still, Dietzsch was sentenced to 15 years in prison for accessory to murder and began to serve his time in Landsberg Prison, a prison for German war criminals. He was in fact incarcerated with people who were responsible for holding him in KZ for more than a decade of his life. After a media campaign of former Buchenwald inmates Werner Hilpert and Eugen Kogon, who made his connections with the KZ underground known as well as lobbying by journalists and resistance members Marion Gräfin Dönhoff and Kurt Schumacher, Dietzsch was released from prison in 1950. He was still treated like a Nazi and only with the help of Hilpert and Kogon was he able to pass Allied denazification, i.e. Entnazifizierung in 1951. 

Germany never recognized him as a political prisoner, he never received compensation for his years in concentration camps. The fact that he saved lives risking his own, was never officially recognized. In addition, he was refused work on base of his dishonorable discharge for treason and subsequent criminal record.
With his health failing due to the long and harsh years in concentration camps, he only survived thanks to the support given by thankful former Buchenwald inmates.
Having found belated happiness with his wife Lilly, née Endryat, he spent the remainder of his life corresponding with former KZ inmates and organizations of former political prisoners and members of the resistance. He later testified in several trials connected to KZ Buchenwald.

His life story was literarily processed by Ernst von Salomon in Das Schicksal des A. D. - Ein Mann im Schatten der Geschichte and published in 1960. A preprint appeared in the weekly newspaper Die Zeit from 1959.

Dietzsch died in August 1974 in Burgdorf / Germany.

Literature and sources 
 Eugen Kogon: Der SS-Staat. Das System der deutschen Konzentrationslager; Frechen: Komet, 2000; 
 Ernst von Salomon: Das Schicksal des A.D. – Ein Mann im Schatten der Geschichte ; Hamburg: Rowohlt Verlag, 1960
 Buchenwald-Hauptprozess: Deputy Judge Advocate's Office 7708 War Crimes Group European Command APO 407: (United States of America v. Josias Prince zu Waldeck et al. – Case 000-50-9), November 1947 Originaldokument in englischer Sprache (PDF-Datei; 9,1 MB)
 Institut für Zeitgeschichte München – Berlin: Nachlaß Arthur Dietzsch (1901–1974). Archiv, Bestand ED 112 Band 1–18 (pdf; 1,3 MB)

External links 

 Jörg Wollenberg: Gespräch mit Stéphane Hessel aus Paris am 2.Februar 2008 zur Kunst des Überlebens in den Konzentrationslagern Buchenwald und Mittelbau–Dora und zur Rolle der Funktionshäftlinge (PDF; 88 kB), S. 2. auf http://www.stiftung-sozialgeschichte.de
 Zentrale Datenbank Nachlässe: Dietzsch, Arthur (1901–1974) auf http://www.nachlassdatenbank.de

1901 births
1974 deaths
Buchenwald concentration camp survivors
People from Vogtlandkreis
Kapos (concentration camp)
People convicted of treason against Germany
German nurses
People convicted in the Dachau trials